Cheruvu Kommu Palem is the name of two villages in Prakasam District, Andhra Pradesh, India:

 Cheruvu Kommu Palem, Darsi mandal
 Cheruvu Kommu Palem, Ongole mandal